Fleming-Neon is a home rule-class city in Letcher County, Kentucky, in the United States. The population was 770 at the 2010 census, down from 840 at the 2000 census.

History
The city was established by the Elkhorn Coal Corporation which moved into the area in 1913. Fleming was the location of the mine and was named for its first president, George W. Fleming. A city named "Chip" existed near the community that became Fleming; it was quickly built up and served as a trading center for the nearby coal towns. The train that hauled the coal out of Fleming would make stops in Neon. Local tradition holds that the conductor would holler instructions to people climbing aboard the train to "Knee On" and this was corrupted into the present name, replacing Chip. In 1977, the two towns were merged into Fleming-Neon during their municipal incorporation by the General Assembly.

Geography
Fleming-Neon is located in eastern Letcher County at  (37.194421, -82.705937). It is bordered to the east by the unincorporated community of McRoberts.

The city is in the valleys of the Wrights Fork and Yonta Fork, part of the upper watershed of the North Fork of the Kentucky River.

Demographics
As of the census of 2000, there were 840 people, 351 households, and 244 families residing in the city. The racial makeup of the city was 96.55% White, 2.86% African American, and 0.60% from two or more races. Hispanic or Latino of any race were 0.60% of the population.

There were 351 households, out of which 27.9% had children under the age of 18 living with them, 49.9% were married couples living together, 16.0% had a female householder with no husband present, and 30.2% were non-families. 26.5% of all households were made up of individuals, and 11.7% had someone living alone who was 65 years of age or older. The average household size was 2.39 and the average family size was 2.88.

In the city, the population was spread out, with 23.5% under the age of 18, 6.9% from 18 to 24, 25.5% from 25 to 44, 26.1% from 45 to 64, and 18.1% who were 65 years of age or older. The median age was 41 years. For every 100 females, there were 97.6 males. For every 100 females age 18 and over, there were 88.6 males.

The median income for a household in the city was $18,421, and the median income for a family was $20,795. Males had a median income of $25,625 versus $23,750 for females. The per capita income for the city was $9,029. About 33.3% of families and 39.4% of the population were below the poverty line, including 55.8% of those under age 18 and 16.8% of those age 65 or over.

Education
Fleming-Neon High School served as the high school for the area for about 80 years. It was built in 1925 by the Elkhorn Coal Corporation to provide an educational system for the children of the coal miners. The school's mascot was a pirate, and the school colors were purple and gold. The original building was destroyed by fire on the night of February 11, 1958. Classes were held in the evenings in the Fleming-Neon Elementary School building until a new building was constructed in the same location as the old building. Classes resumed on the hill until June 6, 2005. The graduating class of 2005 was the last for Fleming-Neon High School due to consolidation with two other county schools, Whitesburg High School and Letcher High School, to form Letcher County Central High School.

Notable people
 Martha Carson, singer
 Jean Chapel, singer
 Johnny Cox, Chicago Zephyrs professional basketball player

References

External links

 uky.edu

 

Cities in Kentucky
Cities in Letcher County, Kentucky
Mining communities in Kentucky
Company towns in Kentucky
Populated places established in 1913
1913 establishments in Kentucky
1977 establishments in Kentucky